Josef Mundy (born 1935, Bucharest, Romania – d. 1994, New York City, New York) was an Israeli author and playwright.

Josef Mundy was born in Bucharest to a prosperous middle class family. At the age of 16 he immigrated to Israel. In the 1960s he lived for a while in France. In general he spent years abroad throughout his life. HaMashber ("the crisis", in Hebrew) published in 1970, was his first play to gain recognition. Initially staged by HaMartef ("the basement") Theatre, it had an eventual run of over 1,000 performances. His plays have been performed by leading Israeli theatre companies including the "Cameri" and "Habima", and at the Acco Festival of Alternative Israeli Theatre. Mundy's works, with political, controversial, and Absurdist elements, show a Brechtian influence. Mundy died in New York City at the age of 59, while rehearsing one of his plays at "La Mama" Theatre.

External links
 Bio notes and bibliography on the Institute for the Translation of Hebrew Literature website

1935 births
1994 deaths
Israeli male dramatists and playwrights
Romanian Jews
Israeli male short story writers
Israeli short story writers
20th-century Israeli dramatists and playwrights
Romanian emigrants to Israel
Israeli people of Romanian-Jewish descent
20th-century short story writers
Recipients of Prime Minister's Prize for Hebrew Literary Works